Marcia Aldrich is an American author specializing in literary non-fiction, memoirs, and personal writing. Her book, Companion to an Untold Story, won the 2011 AWP Award in Creative Non-fiction. She has written personal essays, which have been published in The Gettysburg Review, North American Review, Witness, Arts and Letters, Northwest Review, Brevity, Seneca Review, and others. Fifteen of her essays have been selected as Notable Essays of the year in the Best American Essays series.

Early life and education
Marcia Aldrich was born and raised in Allentown, Pennsylvania. She graduated from Pomona College, in Claremont, California, and went on to earn her doctorate in English at the University of Washington. She currently teaches creative writing at Michigan State University. From 2008 to 2011 she edited Fourth Genre, one of the premiere literary journals featuring personal essays and memoirs. She has received the Excellence in Teaching Award, sponsored by the Amoco Foundation, and the Michigan State University Alumni Club of Mid-Michigan’s Quality in Undergraduate Teaching Award.

Career
In 2010, she was named Distinguished Professor of the Year by the Presidents Council of the State Universities of Michigan.

She is the author of the free memoir Girl Rearing, published by W.W. Norton, selected as a Barnes & Noble Discover New Writers Series, and subsequently cited in Notable Twentieth Century American Literary Nonfiction, in The Best American Essays of The Century, edited by Joyce Carol Oates (Houghton Mifflin). Several of the memoir essays from Girl Rearing were selected for recognition as Notable Essays in the Best American Essay's series, and one, "Hair," was published in The Best American Essays, selected by Joseph Epstein. “Hair” has been included in the college edition of Best American Essays and included in The Beacon Book of Essays by Contemporary American Women. In 2008, “Hair” was included in Laughing Matters', edited by Marvin Diogenes, in a chapter called Observations on Gender.

Since the publication of Girl Rearing, she has continued writing personal essays which have been published in places such as Gettysburg Review, North American Review, Witness, Arts and Letters, Northwest Review, Brevity, and The Normal School, the Kenyon Review, Hotel Amerika, and The Seneca Review" among others and recognized as Notable Essays in The Best American Essays. In 2013 her essay “The Art of Being Born,” originally published in Hotel Amerika was selected by Cheryl Strayed for inclusion in The Best American Essays.Companion to an Untold Story, "about a man’s premeditated suicide and a friend’s struggle to come to terms with his act, was selected by Susan Orlean for the 2011 AWP Award in Nonfiction and published by the University of Georgia Press in 2012. Orlean said, "Exquisitely sad but painstaking in its clarity, Companion to an Untold Story is an effort to understand a friend’s decision to commit suicide. The author lays out the facts and emotions using the structure of an abecedary, as if the simplicity of a child’s alphabet book could bring logic to the terrible puzzle of loss.  There is no suspense in the outcome, but reading the book draws you in so intimately that you, too, feel an urgent need to understand why an intelligent, likeable man would choose, with great deliberateness, to kill himself. This is a difficult subject, written extraordinarily well: a winner."

Aldrich has just completed a collection of her essays The Art of Being Born and is at work on Haze, a narrative of marriage and divorce during her college years.

Selected works
 “The Art of Being Born,” originally published in Hotel Amerika. Selected by Cheryl Strayed for inclusion in their Best American Essays of 2013
 Companion to an Untold Story, University of Georgia Press, 2012
 "Kincaid’s Bite," Fourth Genre, Spring 2012
 "Marilyn Monroe’s Feet," Kenyon Review, Summer 2011
 "Of Pumps and Death", Normal School, Spring 2011
 Girl Rearing'', Norton, 1998.

References

External links 
Official website
Marcia Aldrich at Michigan State University

Living people
American essayists
21st-century American memoirists
American women memoirists
Educators from Allentown, Pennsylvania
Michigan State University faculty
Writers from Allentown, Pennsylvania
Year of birth missing (living people)
Pomona College alumni
21st-century American women writers